The Irish Ice Hockey Association (IIHA) is the official governing body of ice hockey in Ireland.

2013 Ireland participation

See also
Ireland men's national ice hockey team
Ireland women's national ice hockey team
Irish Ice Hockey League

References

External links
Official Site of the Irish Ice Hockey Association
IIHF profile

 
Ice hockey
Ice hockey governing bodies in Europe
International Ice Hockey Federation members
1996 establishments in Ireland